Lycomorpha regulus is a moth of the family Erebidae. It was described by Fordyce Grinnell Jr. in 1903. It is found in North America, including Arizona, California, Colorado and Utah.

The larvae feed on lichens of the genus Parmelia, including Parmelia plittii.

References

Cisthenina
Moths described in 1903